The Dormition Cathedral (Russian language: Успенский собор) in Omsk is one of the largest churches in Siberia. Its fanciful design of many shapes and colors utilizes a plethora of elements from the Russian and Byzantine medieval architectural vocabulary. The main square of Omsk takes its name from the cathedral.

The first stone of a new church was laid by Tsesarevich Nicholas during his journey across Siberia in 1891. A revivalist design was commissioned from Ernest Würrich, a fashionable architect based in Saint Petersburg. The church was consecrated in 1898. It was shut down after the Russian Revolution and was blown up in 1935. The Russian Orthodox Church had the edifice rebuilt to Würrich's original designs in the early 21st century.

The worshippers from all over Siberia come to the church in order to venerate the relics of Bishop Sylvester, a Kolchak supporter who was martyred by the Bolsheviks in 1920.

References 

Churches in Siberia
Omsk
Russian Orthodox cathedrals in Russia
Church buildings with domes
Russian Revival architecture
Churches completed in 1898
Rebuilt churches in Russia
Buildings and structures in Omsk Oblast
Tourist attractions in Omsk Oblast
1898 establishments in the Russian Empire